The Ford Country Sedan is a full-size station wagon that was built by Ford in the United States from 1952 until 1974. It was part of the U.S. Ford full-size car line available in each year.

The Country Sedan was the mid-trim station wagon in the U.S. Ford range. Unlike the Country Squire, the Country Sedan featured plain body sides. As a full-size wagon, it could carry up to 9 passengers, if so equipped. For every year it was sold, regardless of the model line it was aligned with, the Country Sedan outsold the more exclusive Country Squire due to the more modest standard and optional equipment included while using the same powertrain of the more expensive version.

The Country Sedan was based on the Customline from 1952 to 1954. Beginning in 1955, Ford moved their station wagons into their own series and the Country Sedan continued to represent the mid-trim level station wagon. During the 1960s and 1970s, the Country Sedan was approximate to the Galaxie and later the Galaxie 500 in trim elements. For 1972, 1973 and 1974 the model was marketed as the Galaxie 500 Country Sedan and from 1975 it was rebranded LTD wagon. By this time the trim level was identical to the Country Squire apart from the absence of simulated wood exterior paneling.

Sales

Rear gate advances

(Originally from Ford Country Squire)

Prior to 1961, all Ford wagons utilized a two-piece tailgate assembly that required the operator to lift the rear window and lock it into place via a mechanical support, and then drop the tail gate down to fully access the rear compartment.

For the 1961 model year, Ford incorporated a tailgate assembly that featured a self-storing window that could either be rolled down into the gate via crank on the outside of the gate, or by an electrical motor actuated by the key or an interior switch.  A safety lockout measure required that the rear window had to be fully retracted into the gate before it could be lowered.

With the introduction of the 1966 models, all Ford wagons introduced the Magic Door Gate which allowed the tailgate on the vehicle to function as a traditional tailgate that could be lowered, or a door that swung outward for easier access to the seating area. The Magic Door Gate was made possible through a use of a traditional stationary hinge on the right, and a combination of hinges along the doors left side, which carried the weight of the gate as it swung outward when used as a door.

General Motors, Chrysler, AMC, and Toyota would adopt a similar configuration by the end of the 1960s.

References

Country Sedan
Rear-wheel-drive vehicles
Ford Country Sedan
1940s cars
1950s cars
1960s cars
1970s cars
Motor vehicles manufactured in the United States